Emmanuel-Félicité de Durfort, duc de Duras (19 September 1715 – 6 September 1789, Versailles) was a French politician, diplomat, peer, marshal and Freemason (belonging to the l'Olympique de la Parfaite Estime lodge).

Biography
He was the son of Jean-Baptiste de Durfort de Duras and Marie Angélique Victoire de Bournonville.
Aged 18, by his father's abdication of the title, he was already a duke and a musketeer. He took part in all Louis XV's campaigns – that in Italy (1733–1734), on the Rhine (1735 et 1743), in Bavaria (1742), in Flanders (1744–1745) and in Germany (1760–1761). He served as French ambassador to Spain (1752–55), after which he was made a peer of France in December 1755 and marshal of France in March 1775. He was then given command of Brittany, the governorship of Franche-Comté and the post of premier gentilhomme de la chambre du roi. In 1755, he was made governor of Château Trompette.

In 1757, he was made head of the "Comédie-Française" and the "comédie italienne". He was elected to seat 34 of the Académie Française on 2 May 1775. It is said he contributed to the editing of the articles on military science for the Encyclopédie. Also a bibliophile, his library was dispersed at auction in 1790.

His first marriage, in May 1733, was to Charlotte Antoinette de la Porte Mazarin (1719–1735), only daughter of the duc de Mazarin. His second, in June 1736, was to Louise Maclovie de Coëtquen, daughter of Malo III de Coëtquen, the phantom of Combourg mentioned by Chateaubriand. In 1761 he sold part of her dowry, including the county of Combourg to the father of Chateaubriand.

See also 
 Guy Aldonce de Durfort de Lorges, his great-grandfather

References

External links 
Académie française

1715 births
1789 deaths
 4
18th-century French diplomats
Marshals of France
Members of the Académie Française
Knights of the Golden Fleece of Spain
Peers created by Louis XV
18th-century French military personnel
18th-century French politicians